The Blue Notes may be a reference to:

 The Blue Notes, a South African jazz band
 Harold Melvin & the Blue Notes, an American R&B group which featured Teddy Pendegrass
 Neil Young's band on the album This Note's for You, later renamed Ten Men Workin'
 Bluenotes, a Canadian apparel retailer
 "Blue Notes", an a cappella group at the University of Virginia
 The Bluenotes, a 1950s vocal group from North Carolina
 The Blue Notes, later The Merced Blue Notes, an American rock and roll group which featured Roddy Jackson
Blue Notes (album), an album by jazz saxophonist Johnny Hodges

See also
 Blue note (disambiguation)